The 1947 St. Louis Cardinals season was the team's 66th season in St. Louis, Missouri and the 56th season in the National League. The Cardinals went 89–65 during the season and finished second in the National League.

Offseason 
 November 17, 1946: Tom Poholsky was drafted by the Cardinals from the Boston Red Sox in the 1946 minor league draft.
 December 13, 1946: Hal Epps was selected off waivers by the Cardinals from the Philadelphia Athletics.
 Prior to 1947 season: Rip Repulski was signed as an amateur free agent by the Cardinals.

Regular season 
May 6: There were rumors of a walkout by the Cardinals in protest of having to play Jackie Robinson and the Brooklyn Dodgers. The rumors resulted in an article published by Stanley Woodward of the New York Herald Tribune. The Cardinals played the game and lost by a score of 7–6, despite holding a 6–3 lead.
May 21: Jackie Robinson played his first game at Sportsman's Park. The Dodgers won by a score of 4–3 in ten innings.
September 11: Cardinals catcher Joe Garagiola and Jackie Robinson were involved in an incident at home plate. Garagiola stepped on Robinson's foot and the two started arguing. Umpire Bean Reardon held back Garagiola while Robinson clapped. The incident was later part of a children's book titled In the Year of the Boar and Jackie Robinson.

Season standings

Record vs. opponents

Notable transactions 
 May 3, 1947: Harry Walker and Freddy Schmidt were traded by the Cardinals to the Philadelphia Phillies for Ron Northey.

Roster

Player stats

Batting

Starters by position 
Note: Pos = Position; G = Games played; AB = At bats; H = Hits; Avg. = Batting average; HR = Home runs; RBI = Runs batted in

Other batters 
Note: G = Games played; AB = At bats; H = Hits; Avg. = Batting average; HR = Home runs; RBI = Runs batted in

Pitching

Starting pitchers 
Note: G = Games pitched; IP = Innings pitched; W = Wins; L = Losses; ERA = Earned run average; SO = Strikeouts

Other pitchers 
Note: G = Games pitched; IP = Innings pitched; W = Wins; L = Losses; ERA = Earned run average; SO = Strikeouts

Relief pitchers 
Note: G = Games pitched; W = Wins; L = Losses; SV = Saves; ERA = Earned run average; SO = Strikeouts

Farm system 

LEAGUE CHAMPIONS: Houston, St. Joseph

References

External links
1947 St. Louis Cardinals at Baseball Reference
1947 St. Louis Cardinals team page at www.baseball-almanac.com

St. Louis Cardinals seasons
Saint Louis Cardinals season
1947 in sports in Missouri